Hippotragus gigas is an extinct species of antelope known from the Plio-Pleistocene of Africa.

Taxonomy
Hippotragus gigas was discovered by Louis Leakey in 1965, who described it as "a Hippotragus of gigantic proportions". Fossils were first found in Bed II of the Olduvai Gorge in eastern Africa, and have also been found at sites in Algeria and South Africa.

Description
In addition to larger size, the molars can be distinguished by their rounded cusps, large basal pillars, rounded ribs and the large goat folds on lower molars. Its horn cores were also less mediolaterally compressed than its relatives. H. gigas also had a reduced premolar row compared to living Hippotragus species. This is a derived trait for the genus, which suggests that the living species are not descended from H. gigas.

References

Prehistoric even-toed ungulates
Pliocene even-toed ungulates
Pleistocene even-toed ungulates
Prehistoric bovids
Pliocene mammals of Africa
Pleistocene mammals of Africa